Martha Ludowika Genenger (later Engfeld, 11 November 1911 – 1 August 1995) was a German swimmer. She won a European title in 1934 and a silver medal at the 1936 Summer Olympics in the 200 m breaststroke event.

References

1911 births
1995 deaths
German female swimmers
German female breaststroke swimmers
Olympic swimmers of Germany
Swimmers at the 1936 Summer Olympics
Olympic silver medalists for Germany
European Aquatics Championships medalists in swimming
Medalists at the 1936 Summer Olympics
Olympic silver medalists in swimming
Sportspeople from Krefeld